Martinsburg High School is a public high school located in the upper Shenandoah Valley in Martinsburg, West Virginia.  The school is an active member of the WVSSAC. The principal of the school is Trent Sherman.

History and academics

MHS struggled in the late 1960s due to budgetary constraints. The school had a different principal each year in 1968, 1969, and 1970, and did not have any cafeteria facilities on the premises. MHS graduated three National Merit Scholars in 1971.

In 2011 Martinsburg High School became the 623rd official chapter of the Science National Honor Society. Martinsburg High School was the sixth high school in West Virginia to be recognized by the Science National Honor Society.

Sports

All the school's athletic teams compete at the "AAA" level, which includes all of the largest schools in the state. Martinsburg won AAA State Basketball Championships in 1994, 2009, and 2013. Martinsburg has won 9 AAA State Football Championships in 2010, 2011, 2012, 2013, 2016, 2017, 2018, 2019, and 2021. Martinsburg holds West Virginia's record of most consecutive high school AAA Football Championships of all time, winning four straight championships on two occasions, the first during the 2010–2013 seasons and then again from 2016 to 2019. Martinsburg also held the record for the longest winning streak in state history, which began on October 26, 2016 and ended at 57 games with a loss to Spring Valley (Huntington, WV) HS in the 2020-2021 season. Martinsburg currently holds the 2nd longest active win streak in the country. Martinsburg has also been the AAA State Baseball Champions on several occasions, including 1983, 1989, 1996 and 2009.

Martinsburg also competes in women's volleyball, wrestling, men's and women's swimming, men's and women's track, men's and women's cross-country, men's and women's tennis, co-ed golf and cheerleading.

Music

The Martinsburg High School Bulldog Band is composed of approximately 100 students. The jazz band has scored a "superior" rating, the highest rating possible, at every competition in which it has competed. During the 2010 and marching season, the Bulldog Marching Band ranked first in Division 4 at TOB Chapter Championships in Lewis County, WV.  They also went home with an overall score of 88.0, and the award for best auxiliary and best drum major.  The band also accomplished another victory in October 2011, by receiving first at Chapter Championships for the second consecutive year.

MHS's choral department has won numerous Grand Champions and state championships. They are one of the only two MHS sports or extracurricular activities to compete on a national level, the other being theatre. Good Times Show Choir competed at the National Show Choir Competition in April 2014 and in April 2018, winning Best Backstage Crew.

Air Force JROTC

Martinsburg High School hosts the Berkeley County School's Air Force Junior Reserve Officer Training Corps (AFJROTC) WV-071 curriculum. Each year this program instructs over 200 students from all BCS high schools. In 2019 the AFJROTC WV-071 unit earned the highest Headquarters AFJROTC evaluation grade of Exceeds Standards.

Notable alumni

Ray Barker, former Major League first baseman for the New York Yankees.
Scott Bullett, former Major League outfielder for the Chicago Cubs.
Vicky Bullett, a two-time Olympic gold medalist and former WNBA player
Doug Creek, former Major League pitcher (1995–97; 1999–03; 2005).
Juwan Green, NFL wide receiver (Class of 2016)
 Kevin Pittsnogle, a basketball player who played for West Virginia University
 Fulton Walker, a former NFL defensive back and kick returner
 Donte Grantham, a basketball player who played for Clemson University and currently plays for the Oklahoma City Thunder NBA team.

References

External links
Martinsburg High School

Buildings and structures in Martinsburg, West Virginia
Public high schools in West Virginia
Schools in Berkeley County, West Virginia
1883 establishments in West Virginia
Educational institutions established in 1883